Philip Turnbull (born 7 January 1987) is an English semi-professional footballer who plays as a midfielder for  club Dunston UTS.

Turnbull started his career in the youth system of Hartlepool United, and after spending a period on loan with Gateshead he made his Hartlepool debut in 2006. Following a loan with Blyth Spartans he was released by Hartlepool in 2007, before signing for Conference Premier club York City. He was loaned back to Gateshead in 2008, and after being released by York he signed for the club permanently, helping them win successive promotions from the Northern Premier League Premier Division to the Conference Premier.

Early life
Born in South Shields, Tyne and Wear, Turnbull is the twin brother of fellow footballer Stephen Turnbull.

Club career

Hartlepool United
Turnbull joined the Hartlepool United youth system in 2003 and was a member of the teams enjoying successful Dallas Cup campaigns in 2004 and 2005. He began to establish himself in the reserve team over the next couple of years, while still with the youth team. He joined Northern Premier League Premier Division club Gateshead on loan in December 2005, making his debut in a 0–0 home draw with Radcliffe Borough on 17 December. He made five appearances before returning to Hartlepool in February 2006.

He was given his first professional contract with Hartlepool on 4 July 2006. He made his first, and only, appearance for Hartlepool's first team after he started in the 3–1 win over League One team Rotherham United in the Football League Trophy first round on 17 October 2006. He joined Blyth Spartans of the Conference North on 22 January 2007 on a one-month loan and made 11 appearances for the club. He was released by Hartlepool in May 2007.

York City
He was signed by Conference Premier club York City on 6 July 2007. A dislocated shoulder picked up in a pre-season friendly against Frickley Athletic in July 2007 resulted in a six-month lay-off with injury. His York debut came on 12 January 2008 as a 66th-minute substitute in York's 0–0 draw at home to Grays Athletic in the FA Trophy second round.

Gateshead
Having failed to establish himself in the York team under manager Colin Walker, Turnbull rejoined Gateshead on a one-month loan in February 2008 and made his debut against Witton Albion. He agreed a permanent contract with Gateshead on 11 March 2008 after he was released by York. He scored his first career goal on 1 April 2008 in Gateshead's 2–0 win over Prescot Cables at Valerie Park. Turnbull finished the season with 18 appearances and 1 goal for Gateshead as they achieved promotion to the Conference North via the play-offs. The team achieved a second successive promotion, this time to the Conference Premier, after beating A.F.C. Telford United in the 2009 Conference North play-off Final, with Turnbull finishing the season with 49 appearances and 2 goals. He agreed a new one-year contract with the club in May 2012 to cover the 2012–13 season. Turnbull made his 300th appearance for Gateshead on 21 December 2013 in a 4–2 defeat away to Luton Town. He left Gateshead by mutual consent on 29 June 2015 to become a physical education teacher at a school in Sunderland.

Darlington
Turnbull moved into part-time football when signing for newly promoted Northern Premier League Premier Division club Darlington on 29 June 2015. He played 35 of Darlington's 46 league matches in his first season as Darlington finished as champions and were promoted to the National League North. He was again a regular as Darlington finished fifth in the National League North in 2016–17, scoring his first Darlington goal in a 2–0 home win over Gloucester City on 14 January 2017. Although finishing in a play-off position, Darlington were denied entry to the play-offs due to their Blackwell Meadows ground not meeting seating requirements.

On 5 October 2017, Turnbull and Gary Brown were appointed joint caretaker managers of Darlington. They remained in charge until Tommy Wright was appointed manager, achieving their only victory in their third and final match in charge on 21 October 2017 against Bradford Park Avenue.

South Shields
On 25 May 2018, Turnbull left Darlington to join his home-town team South Shields. He made 94 appearances in all competitions before leaving after the 2020–21 season when the end of his contract coincided with the club moving to a full-time training structure.

Dunston UTS
Turnbull remained in part-time football with Northern Premier League Division One East club Dunston UTS.

International career
Turnbull was called into the England under-18 squad in September 2004.

Style of play
Turnbull plays as a central midfielder and is comfortable playing with either foot. He has been described as fiercely competitive and "is more than capable of getting forward to support the front men and chipping in with his fair share of goals".

Career statistics

Managerial statistics

Honours
Gateshead
Northern Premier League Premier Division play-offs: 2007–08
Conference North play-offs: 2008–09

Darlington
Northern Premier League Premier Division: 2015–16

References

External links

Phil Turnbull profile at the Darlington F.C. website

1987 births
Living people
Footballers from South Shields
English footballers
Association football midfielders
Hartlepool United F.C. players
Gateshead F.C. players
Blyth Spartans A.F.C. players
York City F.C. players
Darlington F.C. players
South Shields F.C. (1974) players
Dunston UTS F.C. players
National League (English football) players
Northern Premier League players
English football managers
Darlington F.C. managers
National League (English football) managers
Schoolteachers from County Durham
Twin sportspeople
English twins